Marlboro Packard (August 19, 1828 – February 4, 1904) was a master shipbuilder who lived in Searsport, Maine. He managed several economically important shipyards in Searsport. He built several ships including the ship Oneida in 1877 at the McGilvery Yard. In 1877 he built the ship William H. Conner, which was the last and largest full-rigged ship built in Searsport. This ship's construction took place at the Carver Yard and cost over $100,000. The half-model of this ship is currently housed at the Penobscot Marine Museum.

His parents were Nathan Packard and Mary (Chase) Packard. He married Mary Maria Parke on April 3, 1859. His home, known as the Packard House, was built in 1851, and converted to a motel in 1948. It is currently the home of the Yardarm Motel.

References 

1828 births
1904 deaths
American shipbuilders
People from Searsport, Maine
People from Searsmont, Maine